CKEC-FM is a Canadian radio station broadcasting at 94.1 FM in New Glasgow, Nova Scotia, owned by the Stingray Group. The station airs a soft adult contemporary format branded as 94.1 The Breeze. The transmitter tower is situated on Mount Thom.

History
The station has been on the air since December 23, 1953. Originally broadcasting at 1230 AM, before moving to 1320 in 1960.

In 2006, the station was licensed by the CRTC to convert to the FM dial. As of December 11, 2007, CKEC moved to 94.1 FM. Simulcasting remained on both AM and FM for 90 days, before converting entirely to FM.

On October 28, 2011, Hector Broadcasting applied to the CRTC for a new radio station which will broadcast a mix of classic rock and classic hits with some contemporary rock. If approved, the new station will operate at 97.9 MHz. Hector Broadcasting received a licence to operate a new station, CKEZ-FM, on May 9, 2012.

In November 2017, it was announced that pending approval by the CRTC, this station and its sister CKEZ were to be purchased by Newcap Radio. On January 15, 2021, at 12:01 a.m., CKEC shifted to soft adult contemporary and rebranded as 94.1 The Breeze.

On Air Line-Up
6am-10am Breeze Mornings with Emma 
10am-3pm At Work With Drew
3pm-7pm The Drive Home with Corey Tremere
7pm-12m Evening Breeze With Stacey Thompson

Former logo

References

External links
94.1 The Breeze

Kec
New Glasgow, Nova Scotia
Kec
Radio stations established in 1953
1953 establishments in Nova Scotia
Kec